This is a list of hat-tricks scored in matches involving the Netherlands national football team.

Hat-tricks for the Netherlands

Hat-tricks conceded by the Netherlands

References

Hat-tricks
Netherlands
Netherlands